Port Louisa National Wildlife Refuge is a  National Wildlife Refuge located on the Mississippi River at the border of Illinois and Iowa.  The refuge is east of Wapello, in Louisa County, Iowa and Mercer County, Illinois.

Port Louisa is divided into four divisions: Louisa, Horseshoe Bend, Big Timber (including the islands) and Keithsburg.	  	

Port Louisa is the northernmost refuge in the Mark Twain National Wildlife Refuge Complex. The refuge provides several opportunities for public use including hunting, fishing, hiking, photography, interpretation, environmental education, and wildlife observation (not all activities are allowed on all divisions).

Port Louisa was established for the protection of migratory birds. It is located along the Mississippi Flyway, one of the major routes for migrating waterfowl. Key goals of the refuge are to conserve and enhance the quality and diversity of fish and wildlife and their habitats; and to restore floodplain functions in the river corridor.

References
 Official webpage

Protected areas of Louisa County, Iowa
Protected areas of Mercer County, Illinois
National Wildlife Refuges in Illinois
National Wildlife Refuges in Iowa
Protected areas on the Mississippi River
1958 establishments in Illinois
1958 establishments in Iowa
Protected areas established in 1958